The Order of the Porcupine (French: Ordre du Porc-Épic, Ordre du Camail) was established by Louis de France, Duke of Orléans, in 1394, at the occasion of his elder son Charles of Orléans' baptism.

Award and history 
Louis I, Duke of Orleans declared himself Grand Master of the Order and conferred membership on the lords of his court, with the aim of linking their faithfulness to his person. The knights' number was set to twenty-five, Sovereign Chief included.

Louis I, Duke of Orléans probably chose the porcupine as symbol to show to the Duke of Burgundy John the Fearless that he would revenge of his braving him, as the porcupine points his quills to its enemies.

Nevertheless, after Philip the Good helped free Charles, Duke of Orléans, they granted each other membership of the Order of the Porcupine and the Order of the Golden Fleece in 1430. During Charles' captivity at Mont-St. Michel, he gave membership into the order to Jean d'Argouges and Pierre Crespin.

King Louis XII eventually terminated the Order, preferring the French Order of Saint Michael, but he did grant membership to both Michel Gaillard father and son.

Insignia 
The collar of the order was composed of a tortil of three gold chains, at the end of which a gold porcupine hung on a green-enamelled flowered terrace. It was worn on an azure velvet coat, lined with crimson satin, ornamented with a cope and a mantle, both crimson. Under the coat, the knights wore a long violet garment.

The knights received, on the day of their nomination, a gold ring adorned by a cameo (called in French at the period, "camaïeu" or "kamaheu" or even "camail") upon which a porcupine was engraved. For this reason,  the Order of the Porcupine was also called the Ordre du Camail or "Ordre du Camaïeu" ("Order of the Cameo").

The Latin motto of the order was Cominus et Eminus (English "Near and Far") which was also the motto of Louis I, Duke of Orleans.

Ackermann mentions this chivalric order as a historical order of France.

Porcupine symbol of the Valois-Orleans 
The porcupine remained the King's symbol, as it appears in Blois, even if the order was cancelled by King Louis XII.

Sources

Notes

References

Porcupine